Brodoa is a genus of three species of foliose lichens in the family Parmeliaceae. The genus, circumscribed in 1986 by Trevor Goward, is named in honour of lichenologist Irwin Brodo.

References

Parmeliaceae
Lichen genera
Lecanorales genera
Taxa described in 1987